Pleomax is a brand of Samsung C&T Corporation. Its products range from PC accessories, storage media to batteries.

See also
 Samsung C&T Corporation

External links
 Homepage of Samsung C&T Corporation
 Samsung Trading & Investment Website
 Pleomax Website

Pleomax